Phytoecia halperini is a species of beetle in the family Cerambycidae. It was described by Holzschuh in 1999. It is known from Israel. It feeds on Anchusa strigosa.

References

Phytoecia
Beetles described in 1999